Air Force is the newspaper published by the Royal Australian Air Force. The paper is produced fortnightly and is uploaded online so that members can access it when deployed overseas.

See also 
Navy News (Australia)
Army (newspaper)

External links 
Official Site

Royal Australian Air Force
Military newspapers published in Australia